Athens A is a parliamentary constituency in Attica represented in the Hellenic Parliament. In its present form it dates to 1958, when the Athens B constituency was split off, leaving Athens A with the Municipality of Athens. It elects fourteen Members of Parliament (MPs) by reinforced proportional representation.

Election results

Legislative election

Members of Parliament

2019–present
In the 2019 Greek legislative election, Athens A elected 14 members of parliament:

Jan 2015–2019
In the September 2015 Greek legislative election, Athens A elected 14 members of parliament:

Jan 2015–Aug 2015
In the January 2015 Greek legislative election, Athens A elected 14 members of parliament:

Jun 2012–Jan 2015
In June 2012 Greek legislative election, Athens A elected 17 members of parliament:

Notes and references

External links
    Results and Elected MPs for the September 2015 Election in Athens A constituency (from the website of the Hellenic Ministry of Interior)
   List of Athens A MPs on the website of the Hellenic Parliament

Parliamentary constituencies of Greece
1958 establishments in Greece
Constituencies established in 1958
Politics of Athens